Vitaliy Mykhaylovych Yermakov (born 7 June 1992) is a Ukrainian professional footballer who plays as a centre-back for Chornomorets Odesa.

Club career

Desna Chernihiv
He made his Ukrainian Premier League debut for Desna Chernihiv on 29 July 2018 in a game against FC Mariupol.

He got again into the Quarterfinals of the Ukrainian Cup in the season 2019-20 for the third time in the history of the club.

In Premier League in the season 2019–20, with the club of Chernihiv, got the 4th place, through the play-offs for the Championship round table. On 26 February 2021 he scored his first goal with the team of Desna Chernihiv against Inhulets Petrove in Ukrainian Premier League at the Valeriy Lobanovskyi Dynamo Stadium ended 3-0 for Desna.

Metalist 1925 Kharkiv
In summer 2021 he signed for Metalist 1925 Kharkiv in Ukrainian Premier League where he played 16 matches.

Chornomorets Odesa
On 11 July 2022 he signed for Chornomorets Odesa.

Honours
Stal Alchevsk
 Ukrainian First League runner-up: 2012–13

References

External links
 
 
 

1992 births
People from Rubizhne
Living people
Ukrainian footballers
Association football defenders
FC Stal-2 Alchevsk players
FC Stal Alchevsk players
FC Kramatorsk players
FC Desna Chernihiv players
FC Metalist 1925 Kharkiv players
FC Chornomorets Odesa players
Ukrainian Premier League players
Ukrainian First League players
Ukrainian expatriate footballers
Expatriate footballers in Russia
Ukrainian expatriate sportspeople in Russia
Sportspeople from Luhansk Oblast